"Waves" is a song by American rapper and producer Kanye West from his seventh studio album The Life of Pablo (2016). The song features vocals from American recording artists Chris Brown and Kid Cudi. Music critics positively received the song. West performed the track on multiple occasions during the Saint Pablo Tour. It charted in the United States, United Kingdom, Sweden, Ireland and Canada in 2016. A music video was recorded for it in April 2016, but West chose to never release it. The song, although not released as a single, was commercially successful, being certified 2× Platinum and Silver in the United States and United Kingdom respectively.

Background and development
"Waves" was first conceived during the same week songs such as "All Day" (2015) and Travis Scott's "Piss on Your Grave" (2015) were recorded. It originally contained a sample of "Return to Innocence" (1994) by Enigma, until Scottish producer Hudson Mohawke took the sample out and added choir synths to the track, which ended up becoming "the majority of the song in terms of the instrumental", according to the producer. Mohawke confirmed that the beat for the song was set to be scrapped until a few weeks prior to release and had hinted in a tweet that he was "partially responsible" for the album's last minute name change from Swish to Waves; likely as a result of his contributions to the song. Discussing the production of the song, Mohawke stated that "less is more" and that there are "probably only like six or seven elements in the whole song".

According to co-writer Derek Watkins, better known as Fonzworth Bentley, Chris Brown's feature on the track came about after West asked "Who's the second most hated nigga in America? Chris Brown! I need to do a record with Chris Brown". Bentley then recalled that he walked into the studio one day with "the beat to Waves" being played with "Ye sitting on one side of the studio" and "Chris on the other side". Bentley played a big role in the creation of the chorus with the idea behind the lyric "Waves don't die" coming from his brother's belief that "angels are going to come out of waves crashing against the surf". The creation of the song marked a turning point for The Life of Pablo, as it helped inspire the spiritual themes presented on the album, which was supposed to be titled Swish at the time, and following the making of the song was supposed to be titled after it, as Waves. Kid Cudi revealed that he was sent the song in December 2015 and claimed that he helped edit the song to create a "minimal version", removing ad-libs and all the "extra", so that Chris Brown could be heard better. After assisting in editing the song, Cudi contributed humming to the track.

After The Life of Pablo missed its scheduled release date of February 12, 2016, West tweeted "It's Chance's fault the album not out yet, he really wanted Waves on that bitch. We in the lab now". Chance the Rapper shortly after tweeted that he had fought to keep "Waves" on the album, stating that he "spent all night finishing it". His version of "Waves" was previewed with snippets on Snapchat within the same month as the release of the album that features the final version. During an interview with Zane Lowe, the rapper shared his demo of "Waves", where he did a choir arrangement, which West ended up removing on the final song. The demo also transitions into a flip of the aforementioned removed "Return to Innocence" sample. Additionally, Chance the Rapper's verse on the demo was taken off and re-recorded by West for the final song; garnering him a writing credit. In a 2016 interview, Trinidadian-American singer Theophilus London claimed that he was forced by West to write "Waves" and did do so, but received no credit for it. On February 18, 2016, West's original demo of it leaked online along with demos of a number of other songs by him, including alternate versions of The Life of Pablo tracks such as "FML", "Fade" and "Highlights".

By the time that all of the changes had been made to the album in June 2016, West made sure to re-record the first verse of the song for prevention of it being swallowed by the production.

Release
West was planning to title his 2016 album Waves at one point and have the song play the role of title track, until the album's title was changed to The Life of Pablo on February 10, 2016, with the song being removed from the tracklist. On one of the proposed tracklists, the album was split into three separate acts and the track was part of the first one. Just one day before the album was officially released, it was revealed by Chance that he'd fought to keep the track as a part of it and that was why it was released later than the scheduled date of February 12, 2016. West tweeted out that Chance was to blame for the delay, due to him really wanting "Waves" on The Life of Pablo and revealed that it was still being worked on by February 13. Cudi revealed on April 23, 2016, that him, Mike Dean and Plain Pat were involved in this too.

When the information was revealed that West had shot a music video for the track, speculation began that it was set to be released as a single, but he never chose to do this.

Remixes
A remix of "Waves" that was created by it being reversed was shared by a SoundCloud producer in February 2016, which was made available for download as a WAV file. In July of the same year, an unofficial remix blending West and Chance both rapping their versions of the track was shared via Reddit. During the Saint Pablo Tour on October 25, 2016, a medley was performed live by West in Inglewood that consisted of the "Waves" instrumental and Cudi's vocals on "Father Stretch My Hands, Pt. 1" as a tribute to Cudi in rehab.

Critical reception

"Waves" was subject to widespread acclaim from music critics. Alexis Petridis of The Guardian had great feelings towards the song, describing it as "simultaneously euphoric and elegiac". Pitchfork'''s Jayson Greene felt positively towards the track, describing it as sounding "momentarily benevolent" and voicing the comparison that it has a "similar energy" to that of fellow album track "Famous". It was written by Sheldon Pearce of SPIN that "Waves" is what "serves as the anchor for a discombobulated but altogether splendid group of sonic marvels crafted by a production superteam". Jake Indiana of Highsnobiety branded it as "a blinding moment of triumph and joy" and what "sounds like ascending to heaven with a choir of angels at your back", as well as citing Brown's feature as one of the album's greatest performances. The song was listed by Spencer Kornhaber of The Atlantic as being among the bright spots of The Life of Pablo and he described it as having a "glorious, pulsating sound". Jamieson Cox of The Verge branded the track as what "might be the most beautiful song [West has] ever made". In August 2016, West's wife Kim Kardashian listed the track among her top 28 favourite songs by her husband.

Live performances
On multiple occasions during the Saint Pablo Tour, the track was performed live by West. On April 9, 2016, West performed the song live for the first time, alongside fellow The Life of Pablo tracks "Pt. 2" and "Famous" in the Philippines on the Saint Pablo Tour, shortly before he traveled to Scotland for filming of the music video for it. A medley was performed live by West that consisted of the instrumental from "Waves" and Cudi's vocals from "Father Stretch My Hands, Pt. 1" on October 25, 2016, during a show on the Saint Pablo Tour in Inglewood, which served as a tribute to Cudi who was in rehab at the time and a video was shared by HipHopDX of the performance on Instagram. West danced to his own song when performing it live in Inglewood as part of the Saint Pablo Tour on October 27. On November 20, 2016, as part of the very same tour, he was joined on stage by Cudi in Sacramento to perform the track live, in what was a rather emotional performance – this was at exactly the same concert that West controversially ranted against Jay-Z, Hillary Clinton and more.

Chance gave a live performance of his demo on April 24, 2017, alongside covers of fellow The Life of Pablo tracks "Ultralight Beam", which he has a verse on, and "Father Stretch My Hands, Pt. 1" in San Diego during the Be Encouraged Tour and the cover of "Father Stretch My Hands, Pt. 1" turned out to be more of a group singalong. When performing live at the 2017 Governors Ball Music Festival, cover versions of "Waves", "Ultralight Beam" and "Father Stretch My Hands, Pt.1" were performed by Chance.

Music video
On April 13, 2016, the information was revealed that a music video had been shot for "Waves" by West in Scotland's Isle of Skye, which began speculation of it being released as a single. He traveled there shortly after a live performance in the Philippines on April 9, where the song was part of the set list. Shooting the Hype Williams directed video took several days and West brought 60 crew members with him during his stay on the island, along with several helicopters. After West had finished his stay there at Skeabost Hotel, one of its owners told Daily Record that he: "was the perfect guest — charming, courteous and polite" and a spokesperson for the hotel revealed that photos were banned during the rapper's stay and that his wife didn't accompany him.

Commercial performance
Despite West never releasing it as a single like speculation had it that he would, "Waves" still managed to chart in a total of five countries worldwide and had similar commercial performance to that of fellow album track "Ultralight Beam". The track debuted at number 71 on the US Billboard Hot 100 upon the release of The Life of Pablo. On the US Hot R&B/Hip-Hop Songs chart, "Waves" peaked at number 24 that same week. The following week, it fell down eight places to number 30. In its third and final week on the chart, the song declined a further seven places to number 37. "Waves" performed similarly upon the album's release in the UK to how it did in the US, debuting and peaking at number 77 on the UK Singles Chart. The following week, the song fell down 14 places to number 91 and then never charted again after two weeks on the UK Singles Chart. The song also debuted at its peak on the Canadian Hot 100, reaching number 86 on the chart and spending a total of two weeks on the chart. This made it both the highest charting non-single release from The Life of Pablo in Canada and one of only three non-single releases from it to chart in the country, standing alongside "Ultralight Beam" and "FML". On the week of the album's release, the song reached number 80 on the Singles Top 100 in Sweden. "Waves" barely managed to scratch the Irish Singles Chart, debuting at number 95 one week after The Life of Pablo's release and this placed the track alongside "Ultralight Beam" as the only non-single releases from the album that managed to reach the charts in Ireland.

It was certified Platinum in the US on April 19, 2018, over two years after having been made available to legally stream or download. This made "Waves" join "Ultralight Beam" as one of only two non-single releases from The Life of Pablo to achieve this certification in the US. As well as this, the track was certified Silver in the UK on September 7, 2018. It stands along with "Ultralight Beam" as the only non-single releases from The Life of Pablo'' to be certified in the UK.

Credits and personnel 
Credits adapted from West's official website.
Songwriting – Kanye West, Chris Brown, Scott Mescudi, Cydel Young, Tony Williams, Elon Rutberg, Ross Birchard, Derek Watkins, Mike Dean, Chancelor Bennett, Leland T. Wayne, Ernest Brown, Fred Bratwaithe, Robin Diggs, Kevin Ferguson, Theodore Livingston, Darryl Mason, James Whipper
Production – Kanye West & Charlie Heat for Very Good Beats, Inc.
Co-production – Hudson Mohawke, Metro Boomin & Mike Dean #MWA for Dean's List Productions
Additional production – Anthony Kilhoffer
Engineering – Noah Goldstein, Andrew Dawson, Anthony Kilhoffer, Mike Dean & Tom Kahre
Mix – Manny Marroquin at Larrabee Studios, North Hollywood, CA
Mix assisted – Chris Galland, Ike Schultz & Jeff Jackson
Vocals – Chris Brown & Kid Cudi

Charts

Certifications

Notes

References 

2016 songs
American pop songs
Chris Brown songs
Kanye West songs
Kid Cudi songs
Music videos directed by Hype Williams
Song recordings produced by Charlie Heat
Song recordings produced by Hudson Mohawke
Song recordings produced by Kanye West
Song recordings produced by Metro Boomin
Song recordings produced by Mike Dean (record producer)
Songs written by Chance the Rapper
Songs written by Charlie Heat
Songs written by Chris Brown
Songs written by Cyhi the Prynce
Songs written by Fab Five Freddy
Songs written by Fonzworth Bentley
Songs written by Kanye West
Songs written by Kid Cudi
Songs written by Metro Boomin
Songs written by Mike Dean (record producer)